Delmon may refer to:

Delmon University for Science & Technology, former university in Bahrain
Dilmun, ancient polity in Arabia
Delmon Young (born 1985), American baseball player

See also
 Delnon, a surname